Acinodrillia paula is a species of sea snail, a marine gastropod mollusk in the family Drilliidae.

Description
The length of the claviform shell attains 11.8 mm, its width 4.2 mm. It shows the general characteristics of the genus, but is especially characterized by the axial grooves that are cut on the body whorl by spiral grooves, forming a lozenge-shaped pattern.

Distribution
This marine species occurs in the Agulhas Bank, South Africa

References

 J. Thiele (1925) Gastropoden der Deutschen Tiefsee-Expedition. In:. Wissenschaftliche Ergebnisse der Deutschen Tiefsee-Expedition II. Teil, vol. 17, No. 2, Gutstav Fischer, Berlin.

External links
 BioLib: Acinodrillia paula

Endemic fauna of South Africa
paula
Gastropods described in 1925